Sandwich Secondary School is a school in LaSalle, Ontario. It has about 1,050 students, and teaches about half of the students in LaSalle, along with St. Thomas of Villanova Catholic Secondary School. Sandwich Secondary School is part of the Greater Essex County District School Board, or GECDSB. It was named after the former town of Sandwich, which used to encompass the western shores of Windsor, as well as LaSalle.

About
Prior to the opening of the school building in 1970/71, high school students in LaSalle were bused to General Amherst High School.

Sandwich Secondary's track-and-field complex, named the Robert C. Carrick Memorial Track, opened in 1993 at a cost of $1.70 million and includes an 8-lane rubberized all weather track, field house, grandstand, football and soccer field, baseball diamond, track and field event area (shot-put, a discus circle, all weather javelin approach, all weather runways for long jump, triple jump, pole vault), and a concession stand. The complex was named after a police officer who was killed in the line of duty in 1968 and is home to the Sandwich Sabres Men's Football team. 
Sandwich Secondary also has a French immersion program for those coming from French immersion grade schools along with an English public schooling.

Its feeder schools, or family of elementary schools, are Sandwich West Public School, LaSalle Public School, Sacred Heart Roman Catholic School, Legacy Oak Trail Public School, Giles Campus and École Bellewood Public School.

Notable alumni

Tang Bacheyie – former CFL player
Dave Beneteau – Lawyer, MMA fighter
Jeff Burrows – drums, percussion in the Canadian Rock Groups The Tea Party and Crash Karma
Stuart Chatwood – bass, guitar, keyboards,  in the Canadian Rock Group The Tea Party
Andy Delmore – former NHL player
Richie Hawtin – Electronic Music artist and world-renowned DJ
Jeff Martin – vocals, guitar, in the Canadian Rock Group The Tea Party
Kylie Masse – Olympic swimmer
Kamau Peterson – former CFL player
Amanda Reason – Olympic swimmer and former women's 50-metre breaststroke world record-holder (long course)
Sofia Shinas – Actress
Christian Vincent – professional dancer, choreographer, actor and model

See also
List of high schools in Ontario

References

External links

Sandwich Secondary School

High schools in Essex County, Ontario
1970 establishments in Ontario
Educational institutions established in 1970